Mikey Bennett is a Jamaican music producer, composer, musician and singer.

Early life and influences 
Mikey Bennett was born into a Christian family in Jamaica. Church is where Bennett realised he had musical talent. At the age of 12, Bennett was influenced greatly by guitarist Mikey Chung. He would write his lyrics and Chung would help Bennett put them to music. He attended what is now the Northern Caribbean University based in Mandeville, Jamaica.

Career 
Bennett has been on the music scene since the 1980s.  He has composed and produced music for international artists including Ziggy Marley, Maxi Priest, Dennis Brown, and UB40, Shabba Ranks, J.C. Lodge, Cocoa Tea,  Home T Four, Admiral Bailey, and Johnny Osbourne. He recently directed and produced a reggae album titled The Heart of Jamaica for the longtime rum producer Appleton Estate.

Bennett is the CEO of Grafton Studios in Vineyard Town, St. Andrew, Jamaica. He has also taught song writing at the University of Technology (Utech), Kingston, Jamaica. He has received many honours, among them the Jamaica Reggae Industry Association (JaRIA) award in 2017 for mentorship.

Social responsibility 
Bennet is involved in the Tower Street Correctional Facility music programme in Kingston, Jamaica and the St Catherine adult correctional centre.
Bennett also judges competitions for spotting local musical talents.

Discography

References 

Jamaican record producers
Living people
Jamaican reggae musicians
Jamaican businesspeople
Year of birth missing (living people)